The Longview Texans minor league baseball team played in the East Texas League (1940, 1949–1950) and the Lone Star League (1947–1948). The team, which was based in the American city of Longview, Texas, was affiliated with the Chicago White Sox and St. Louis Cardinals in 1940 and the New York Yankees in 1948.

Notable alumni
Jimmy Adair
Heinz Becker
Merv Connors
Tex Jeanes
Paul Kardow
Jesse Landrum
Ralph McCabe
Dixie Parsons
Jackie Sullivan

Adair and Jeanes managed the team in 1940, Landrum managed the team in 1947 and Parsons managed the team from 1948 to 1950.

References

Baseball teams established in 1940
Defunct minor league baseball teams
Sports clubs disestablished in 1950
1940 establishments in Texas
1950 disestablishments in Texas
Longview, Texas
Chicago White Sox minor league affiliates
St. Louis Cardinals minor league affiliates
New York Yankees minor league affiliates
Defunct baseball teams in Texas
Baseball teams disestablished in 1950
East Texas League teams